Dioscorea altissima is a herbaceous vine in the genus Dioscorea that is indigenous to forested areas of Brazil, Bolivia, Peru, Central America north to Panama, and the Caribbean. Its tubers are foraged and cooked for human consumption, and they are also cultivated in Brazil on a small scale. This species has been introduced to Puerto Rico.

References

altissima